Agnès Chiquet (born 24 October 1984 in Paris) is a French weightlifter.

She competed at the 2002 European Junior Championships, winning a bronze medal, 2009 Mediterranean Games winning a bronze medal, and 2006 European Union Tournament winning a gold medal.

She was French champion in 2016, 2018, and 2019.

References

External links
 
 
 

1984 births
People from Paris
Living people
French female weightlifters
Mediterranean Games bronze medalists for France
Mediterranean Games medalists in weightlifting
Competitors at the 2009 Mediterranean Games
21st-century French women